The Hawaiian Potters Guild produced handmade glazed earthenware ceramics in Honolulu, Hawaii in the 1930s and 1940s.

Origins
In 1931, Sarah Wilder (Mrs. James A. Wilder), wife of the painter James Austin Wilder, began offering pottery courses at the Honolulu Museum of Art. These classes were expanded about 1937 by Mrs. Nancy Andrew, which led to the formation of the Hawaiian Potters Guild.  The Guild remained active into the 1940s.

Its output was mostly functional and based upon plants found in Hawaii. The guild also produced purely decorative pieces, such as the platter in shape of taro leaf with guava branch (illustrated), which was made for the luxury retailer S. & G. Gump and Company.
 
The Hawaiian Potters Guild should not be confused with the Hawaii Potters’ Guild, which was founded in 1967 and continues today.

References

American art pottery
Hawaii art
Arts organizations based in Hawaii
Guilds in the United States